El armario  (English language:The Cupboard) is a 2001 Argentine film directed and written by Gustavo Corrado. The film premiered on 3 May 2001 in Buenos Aires. The film starred Jean Pierre Reguerraz and Pamela Rementería, who was nominated for a Silver Condor Best Actress Award for her performance. Also starring Adolfo Coroa and Lelia Dondoglio.

External links
 

2001 films
2000s Spanish-language films
2001 drama films
Argentine drama films
2000s Argentine films